Yundong Gongyuan station, is a station of Line 2 of the Xi'an Metro. It started operations on 16 September 2011.

The station will be renamed Fengcheng 10-lu station in 2023 when Line 2 Phase 2 opens.

References

Railway stations in Shaanxi
Railway stations in China opened in 2011
Xi'an Metro stations